The Scottish Rugby Academy, for sponsorship reasons the Fosroc Scottish Rugby Academy, is a national academy structure designed to give Scotland's young rugby stars a pathway into the professional game.

The academy structure is based on 4 regional academies geographically based on the traditional districts of Glasgow District. Edinburgh District, North and Midlands and South.

Background
The regional academies were launched at the University of Aberdeen’s Hillhead campus on 1 October 2014 at the flagship academy in Caledonia, which is a combination of North and Midlands regions.

The Academies are open to the best talent, male and female, from the age of 14 onwards. The initial focus will be on players within the 16, 18 and 20-year-old age-groups and the top tier of the academy, stage three, will replace the current Elite Development Player strand within the pro-clubs.

They will also seek to develop the next tranche of coaches and seek to better bridge the gap between the club and professional game.

Academy Development Stages

Supported stages

Stage 1 and 2 are known as the supported stages. They are often combined in the listing of annual intakes.

Stage 1 - Early Talent Identification
Regionally selected and regionally supported players

Under 14 and Under 15 players invited to attend regional skills camps and local pathway sessions/matches as an initial Academy selection process.

Stage 2 - Player Membership Terms
Nationally selected and regionally supported players

Selected as having the potential to play professional rugby or influence the future success of Scotland Women's rugby. Players will be managed by Scottish Rugby through the Academy Membership Terms and supported regionally within the academy structure.

Contracted stage

These players are given a professional contract by the Scottish Rugby Academy. Although given placements at professional clubs, they are not contracted by Glasgow Warriors or Edinburgh etc. Players graduate from the academy when a professional club contract is offered.

Stage 3 - Player Contract
Nationally selected and regionally supported players

Players selected by Scottish Rugby and supported through the academy based on Academy Membership Terms but who are also separately contracted by the Scottish Rugby Union and aligned to a professional club and supported regionally within the academy structure.

Regional Academies

Caledonia

The Caledonia Academy was the first of the four academies built in Scotland, a year before the others arrived in 2015. Originally Bruce Frame was announced as manager of the Caledonia Academy. He has since been joined with other coaches. Both Aberdeen University and the Aberdeen Sports Village offer their facilities to the rugby union students.

Edinburgh

Former Scotland international scrum-half Graeme Beveridge was announced as manager of the Edinburgh Academy.

The facilities include a number of exercise physiology labs, one featuring an environment chamber that simulates altitude, humidity, and hot and cold conditions.

An extension will be built to the university's current performance gym, which will include a 20-metre running track and physio area, as well as free weights and cardio machines.

Glasgow and the West

Along with the announcement of Bruce Frame, Jamie Dempsey was initially appointed Manager of the Glasgow and West Academy. After leaving the Scotland women's national rugby union team on 2019, Shade Munro is now the Lead Coach of the Glasgow Academy.

Work went underway to create a new purpose-built facility, on-site at Broadwood Stadium, Cumbernauld, with fitness and medical equipment, all part of Scottish Rugby's major policy initiative to develop a regional Academy system.

The Glasgow and West Academy has relocated to the Ravenscraig Regional Sports Facility in Motherwell for season 2019–20.

Borders and East Lothian

The Borders and East Lothian Academy will operate from the Netherdale Campus, in Galashiels.

This is the fourth and final facility to be announced and has been made possible through a partnership with Heriot-Watt University, Borders College, Gala Junior Rugby Council and the Borders Sport and Leisure Trust.

Chris Dewsnap, the Borders and East Lothian Academy Manager, and his staff will have access to gym facilities at TriFitness and the 3G pitch at Fairydean, while Heriot-Watt will provide office, rehab and medical space, with Hayward Pavilion hosting changing and on-field medical facilities. Borders College will provide access to the gym and will offer additional office space.

Current Season

Previous Seasons

Competition

The academy teams compete in the U-20 Championship, U-18 Championship and U-16 Championship.

Sponsorship

Originally sponsored as the BT Scottish Rugby Academy for the first three seasons, the academy was sponsored by Fosroc in season 2018–19.

Honours

 Glasgow City Sevens
 Champions (1): 2016

References

 
Scottish rugby union teams
rugby union
Scottish Rugby U-20 Championship